Edward Stack was a member of the Wisconsin State Assembly.

Biography
Stack was born on August 11, 1918, in Superior, Wisconsin. During World War II, he served in the United States Army. He was a member of the Veterans of Foreign Wars, as wells as the Fraternal Order of the Eagles and the Knights of Columbus. He died on December 31, 2006.

Political career
Stack was elected to the Assembly in 1968. Additionally, he was a member of the Superior Common Council and Supervisor of the Douglas County, Wisconsin Board. He was a Democrat.

References

Politicians from Superior, Wisconsin
Democratic Party members of the Wisconsin State Assembly
County supervisors in Wisconsin
Wisconsin city council members
Military personnel from Wisconsin
United States Army soldiers
United States Army personnel of World War II
1918 births
2006 deaths
20th-century American politicians